Kārākāt is a village and corresponding Community Development Block in Rohtas district of Bihar, India. As of 2011, the village of Karakat has a population of 2563, in 400 households; the total population of Karakat block is 209,284.

Demographics 
The population of Karakat block increased from 179,195 in 2001 to 209,284 in 2011, a 16.8% increase. This was a slightly decadal lower growth rate than the average of Rohtas district.

As of 2011, Karakat block had a sex ratio of 920 females for every 1000 males, which was about average for Rohtas district. The ratio was slightly higher among the 0-6 age group, with 926 females for every 1000 males. There were 37,804 members of scheduled castes in the block, representing 18.06% of the population, which was about average for Rohtas district. Members of scheduled tribes in the block numbered 455, or 0.22% of the population, which was somewhat lower than the district average 1.12%. The literacy rate in Karakat block was 73.94%, which was lower than the district average of 73.37%. Literacy was higher in men (85.26%) than in women (61.61%); the corresponding 23.65% gender gap was the highest in Rohtas district.

Employment 
A majority of the population of Karakat block is employed in agriculture. In 2011, 24.97% of the workforce was employed as cultivators who owned or leased their own land, and 46.82% of the workforce was employed as agricultural labourers who worked someone else's land for wages. A further 8.81% was employed as household industry workers, the highest proportion in Rohtas, and the remaining 17.97% were engaged in other forms of work.

Amenities 
All 128 inhabited villages in Karakat block, including Karakat itself, have access to clean drinking water, but none have tap water; instead, water is supplied by well and hand pump. 103 of the villages (80.47%) had schools, which served 94.14% of the block's population. 61 had medical facilities, serving 59.37% of the population, which was above the Rohtas district average of 35.63% served by medical facilities. 36 villages had post offices. 60 villages had telephone service, serving 62.11% of the block's population; this was about average for Rohtas district. 72 villages had transport communications (bus, rail, or navigable waterways). 20 villages had banks, and 19 had agricultural credit societies. 82 villages had pucca roads. 118 villages, Karakat among them, had access to electricity; 89.48% of the overall block population had access to electricity.

Villages 
Karakat block has 128 inhabited villages and 22 uninhabited ones, for a total of 150 villages:

See also 
Karakat (Lok Sabha constituency)

References 

Community development blocks in India